Matteo Voltolini (born 30 July 1996) is an Italian professional footballer who plays as a goalkeeper for  club Reggiana.

Career
Born in Reggio Emilia, Voltolini started his career in local club Reggiana.

On 28 July 2016, he joined Serie D club Triestina.

On 7 September 2017, he signed with Serie C club Pisa. Voltolini made his professional debut on 21 January 2018 against Monza. On 2 August 2018, he was loaned to Fano for the  2018–19 season.

He returned to Reggiana in 2019.

Notes

References

External links
 
 

1996 births
Living people
Sportspeople from Reggio Emilia
Italian footballers
Association football goalkeepers
Serie C players
Serie D players
A.C. Reggiana 1919 players
U.S. Triestina Calcio 1918 players
Pisa S.C. players
Alma Juventus Fano 1906 players
Footballers from Emilia-Romagna